Transcription factor ETV7 is a protein that in humans is encoded by the ETV7 gene.

References

Further reading

External links
 Drosophila anterior open - The Interactive Fly